Tunguliðsá is a small river in the village Sørvágur on the Faroe Islands. It runs into another small river Hanusará.

Rivers of the Faroe Islands